King Comics, a short-lived comic book imprint of King Features Syndicate, was an attempt by King Features to publish comics of its own characters, rather than through other publishers. A few  King Comics titles were picked up from Gold Key Comics. King Features placed former Gold Key editor Bill Harris in charge of the line.

The line ran for approximately a year and a half, with its series cover-dated from August 1966 to December 1967. The King Comics Flash Gordon title was well-received, winning three Alley Awards in 1966 and another in 1967. The series had distribution problems throughout its run. Several distributors refused to take the King Comics because their first issues lacked a Comics Code Authority seal; King subsequently obtained a CCA seal on all later King Comics issues. King Features tried to overcome the distribution problem by selling its titles in special "King Paks" of three to variety stores and supermarkets.  This tactic failed to gain more readers, and the King Comics line was discontinued.  

Many stories created for King Comics were later published in the continuation of most of King's titles by Charlton Comics.

Titles
 Beetle Bailey  #54-65 (Aug. 1966 - Dec. 1967), continued from Gold Key, continued by Charlton with #67 (#66 sold overseas only by King)
 Blondie Comics  #164-175 (Aug. 1966 - Dec. 1967), continued from Harvey Comics, continued by Charlton with #177 (no #176 was published)
 Flash Gordon  #1-11 (Sept. 1966 - Dec. 1967), continued by Charlton
 Jungle Jim  #5 (Dec. 67), reprinted Dell Comics' issue #5, continued by Charlton using Dell's numbering
 Mandrake the Magician  #1-10 (Sept. 1966 - Nov. 1967)
 The Phantom  #18-28 (Sept. 1966 - Dec. 1967), continued from Gold Key, continued by Charlton
 Popeye  #81-92 (Sept. 1966 - Nov. 1967), continued from Gold Key, continued by Charlton

See also
Ace Comics
Disney comics
The Sunday Funnies

References

Publishing companies established in 1966
Publishing companies disestablished in 1967
Publishing companies based in New York City
1966 comics debuts
Comic book publishing companies of the United States
Defunct comics and manga publishing companies